Munshi Raziuddin Ahmed Khan (1912 – 2003) was a Pakistani Qawwali singer, a classical musician and a researcher and scholar of music. He belongs to the well-known Qawwal Bachchon Ka Gharana of Delhi.

Career

Initially, he performed in the court of the Nizam of Hyderabad, India with his cousin Bahauddin Khan. However, after the fall of Hyderabad in 1948 to India, he moved to Karachi, Pakistan. In 1956, he formed a qawwali group along with his cousins, Bahauddin Qawwal and Manzoor Ahmed Niazi. This ensemble or group lasted until 1966.

After 1966, Munshi Raziuddin turned to solo work, forming his own Qawwali party, and was a successful qawwal until his death in 2003. Traditional Qawwali singing heritage of the city of Karachi can still be felt and seen in a small neighborhood in Karachi named Qawwali Gali (Qawwali Street) in the Saddar Town area of Karachi city, where a street is named after Munshi Raziuddin Qawwal. 

He trained his sons Farid Ayaz & Abu Muhammad, Ghulam Akram and Ali Akbar. He also trained his nephews Qawwal Najmuddin - Saifuddin & Brothers (Sons Of Bahauddin Qawwal), and his other nephews Abdullah Manzoor Niazi & Masroor Ahmed Niazi (sons Of Manzoor Niazi).

Munshi Raziuddin was succeeded by his sons, Fareed Ayaz and Abu Muhammad, who perform as Fareed Ayaz Qawwal in 2022.

Awards and recognition
 For his contribution and devotion to Sufi music, he was awarded with the Pride of Performance Award in 1967 by the President of Pakistan.

References

External links
Munshi Raziuddin Qawwal - Shikwa/Jawab E Shika 
Fareed Ayaz Qawwal (Coke Studio Pakistan) qawwali performance on YouTube 

1912 births
2003 deaths
Pakistani qawwali singers
Muhajir people
20th-century Pakistani male singers
20th-century Indian male singers
20th-century Indian singers
Recipients of the Pride of Performance
People from Delhi